The Miramshah airstrike took place on Friday 12 September 2008 in Miramshah in North Waziristan in the Federally Administered Tribal Areas (FATA) in Pakistan. It was part of a series of attacks targeting presumed militants, and was carried out by a United States Air Force drone aircraft. It took advantage of the power vacuum in Pakistan, following the fall of Pervez Musharraf on 18 August 2008. The missiles hit two buildings – in one three women and two children were killed, and in the other seven Taliban militants died.

President George W. Bush had two months prior to this attack issued a classified order authorizing US raids against militants in Pakistan without prior approval from Islamabad.

Missile strikes have traditionally provoked an outpouring of public resentment that Musharraf's political opponents used to help drive him from power. Many of those opponents are now seated in the new government – giving it broader political support and fewer high-profile critics.

The attack came at the same time as American and international troops was fighting Taliban and al-Qaeda militants close by in neighboring Afghanistan. The upsurge in strikes alarmed Pakistani military and government officials, who said it seriously undermined their counter-insurgency operations. Pakistan had repeatedly stated, that it would not allow foreign forces onto its territory and that it would vigorously protect its sovereignty. It said that cross border raids were not the best way of fighting the "war against terror".

See also
 Insurgency in Khyber Pakhtunkhwa
United States and state terrorism
 List of drone strikes in Pakistan

References

Airstrikes of the insurgency in Khyber Pakhtunkhwa
September 2008 events in Asia
2008 in military history
2008 in Pakistan